Denni Patschinsky (born 26 August 1983) is a former professional footballer who played as a forward. Born in Denmark, Patschinsky has a German father and represented Germany at youth level.

Career

Despite offers from VfL Wolfsburg in the German Bundesliga, Patschinsky remained with Danish top flight side Viborg FF until 2004.

At the 2003 FIFA World Youth Championship, he represented Germany through his German father even though he was not considered good enough for the Denmark under-20 national team.

After that, Patschinsky played for German third division clubs Eintracht Braunschweig, TuS Koblenz and Kickers Emden but returned to the Danish lower leagues due to injury.

References

External links

Profile at DFB.de

Danish men's footballers
Living people
1983 births
Association football wingers
Association football forwards
Viborg FF players
TuS Koblenz players
Eintracht Braunschweig players
Kickers Emden players
Skive IK players
Hvidovre IF players
People from Esbjerg
Danish people of German descent
Germany youth international footballers
Vanløse IF players
Brønshøj Boldklub players
BK Søllerød-Vedbæk players
Germany under-21 international footballers
Sportspeople from the Region of Southern Denmark